Obor is a metro station in Bucharest, located next to one of the largest open-air markets in Bucharest, Obor. The station was closed for over 10 months, until May 25, 2008, for refurbishment and in order to facilitate the building of a new overground passage for the tram above ground. This station is painted in blue, with pillars separating the two parts of the station. It is currently served by the M1 line.
Connections with STB services are 1, 21, 46 (trams), 330 and 335 (buses).

The current station was built in 1979 once with the completion of the Obor underpass. Before 1989 a tram line used to run where the current station is located, integrating a tram stop in the underpass. After the construction of the metro the tram tracks were moved above, and in 2008 they were separated from the road, at the same time when the metro station was closed. The metro station was opened on 17 August 1989 as part of the extension from Gara de Nord to Dristor.

References

Bucharest Metro stations
Railway stations opened in 1989
1989 establishments in Romania